James S. Armstrong may refer to:

James Sherrard Armstrong (1821–1888), Canadian lawyer and jurist
James Sinclair Armstrong (1915–2000), American politician

See also
James Armstrong (disambiguation)